Josefa Zaratt (also Zarratt) (born 19 March 1871, died 4 August 1962) was one of the first African-American women to graduate from Tufts Medical School. Finding this information was done by going through school records. There were not very many African American women who were able to go to school during these times. They often would leave the south and head north to a school where they could study medicine. These schools were still very heavily segregated.

Scholarships at this time were not given to women of color. Some African American women applied for scholarships, but would be turned down due to the color of their skin.

It is also believed that African American women went into medical school with higher levels of education than white women. This is reasoned by the fact that it was much more difficult to be accepted into medical schools with the same level education as other applicants. Black women had to be more decorated in their education levels for a smaller fragment of being accepted.

The gap between women of color and white women continued to grow even after accomplishing the goal of graduating medical school. When it came to internships and jobs it was even more difficult than getting into medical school. Still staying in the northern parts of the country, jobs were rare for African American women. Patients also would not prefer to see them or be treated by them. They could turn down treatment from a female African American doctor if they wished.

The first women to receive a medical degree in the United States was in 1849 and was received by Elizabeth Blackwell. The first African American female received a medical degree just four years later

Career 
Josefa Zarratt moved back to her native Puerto Rico, and was practicing medicine in 1906. However, she couldn't get accredited, so returned to the continental US.

Zaratt was one of the women who begun paving the path for African American women in the medical field. While they are few of these women, they all played an important role.

She worked at Douglass Hospital in Philadelphia in 1910. By 1923, she was practicing medicine in Springfield, Massachusetts.

Zaratt died on 	August 4, 1962, at Fordham Hospital in the Bronx, New York.

References 

1871 births
1962 deaths
African-American physicians
Puerto Rican physicians
Puerto Rican women physicians
20th-century women physicians
Tufts University School of Medicine alumni
20th-century African-American people
20th-century African-American women